Pandanus dubius, commonly known as bakong or knob-fruited screwpine, is a species of Pandanus (screwpine) native to Island Southeast Asia, New Guinea, and the Western Pacific islands (Melanesia and Micronesia), and possibly also to the Andaman and Nicobar Islands.

Taxonomy
Pandanus dubius was first described by the German botanist Kurt Polycarp Joachim Sprengel in 1826. It is classified in the subgenus Rykia, section Hombronia.

Description
The leaves are lanceolate in shape with shallow serrations along the edges. Bakong are dioecious, having separate male and female plants.

Habitat
Bakong typically grows on beaches, rocky areas, and limestone outcrops in coastal ecosystems.

Uses
Like other species of pandanus, the leaves of bakong are commonly harvested for weaving mats and other handicrafts in the Philippines, Halmahera, the Bismarck Archipelago, and the Solomon Islands. Fibers from the roots can also be made into ropes or twine.

The white seeds are edible and taste like coconuts. The flesh of the fruits can also be cooked and eaten. They are eaten in Guam, the Philippines, and Rota Island. Bakong are also commonly cultivated as ornamentals.

See also
Pandanus amaryllifolius
Pandanus odoratissimus
Pandanus utilis
 Domesticated plants and animals of Austronesia

References

dubius
Flora of Malesia
Flora of the Pacific
Flora of Papuasia